The Aviation Parkway is a parkway in Ottawa, Ontario, Canada.

The parkway begins at Highway 417 and proceeds north, passing beside Ken Steele Park and Ottawa's only French college, La Cité collégiale. It continues north, passing beside the national headquarters of the Canada Mortgage and Housing Corporation, crossing Montreal Road, passing beside the Montfort Hospital, and ending at the Canadian Aviation Museum.

The parkway is bordered on either side by significant woods and fields that are the property of the National Capital Commission. Being a federal roadway, the Aviation Parkway is patrolled by the RCMP instead of the local police force.

Roads in Ottawa
Parkways in Ontario